Magliolo is a comune (municipality) in the Province of Savona in the Italian region Liguria, located about  southwest of Genoa and about  southwest of Savona.

Magliolo borders the following municipalities: Bardineto, Calizzano, Giustenice, Rialto, and Tovo San Giacomo.

References

Cities and towns in Liguria